DaQuan Steven Jones ( born December 27, 1991) is an American football defensive tackle for the Buffalo Bills of the National Football League (NFL). He was drafted by the Tennessee Titans in the fourth round of the 2014 NFL Draft. He played college football at Penn State.

Early life
Jones was born on December 27, 1991, in Johnson City, New York. He attended Johnson City Senior High School, where he played football and basketball as well as throwing the shot put.

Recruiting

Initially projected as an offensive guard, Jones committed to Penn State on June 28, 2009 after being recruited by Mike McQueary.

College career
After limited action in his freshman and sophomore seasons, Jones was Penn State's starting defensive tackle opposite Jordan Hill in 2012, his junior season and recorded 22 tackles, two tackles for a loss, and a half sack. During the subsequent offseason, Jones committed to losing weight to become quicker, and dropped 25 pounds, coming into the 2013 season at 315 pounds. In the first game of the 2013 season, Jones' work paid off, as he recorded nine tackles, three for a loss, and a sack. After the second game, Jones had already amassed 18 tackles, 5 tackles for a loss (TFL), and 2 sacks. After three games, his five TFL led the Big Ten. Halfway through the season, ESPN.com called him Penn State's defensive most valuable player.

Professional career

Tennessee Titans
Jones was rated the number one overall defensive tackle by some analysts coming into the 2013 season. He was drafted by the Tennessee Titans in the fourth round (112th overall) of the 2014 NFL Draft.

In Week 17 of the 2014 season, Jones, recorded his first career sack against the Colts, tacking on four tackles including a forced fumble. Jones started in all 16 games in 2015 and 2016. He scored his first touchdown on January 1, 2017, after recovering a fumble in the end zone.

In 2017, Jones started the first 12 games before suffering torn biceps and was placed on injured reserve on December 4, 2017. He finished the season with 31 tackles and a career-high 3.5 sacks.

On March 14, 2018, Jones signed a three-year, $21 million contract extension with the Titans.

On September 29, 2020, Jones was placed on the reserve/COVID-19 list by the team. He was activated on October 11. Jones finished his final season playing for Tennessee with a career-high 49 tackles.

Carolina Panthers
Jones signed a one-year contract with the Carolina Panthers on April 20, 2021.

Buffalo Bills
Jones signed a two-year contract with the Buffalo Bills on March 16, 2022.

NFL career statistics

Regular season

Postseason

References

External links
Tennessee Titans bio
Penn State Nittany Lions football bio
Career stats

1991 births
Living people
American football defensive tackles
Buffalo Bills players
Carolina Panthers players
Penn State Nittany Lions football players
People from Johnson City, New York
Players of American football from New York (state)
Tennessee Titans players